Malacarne is an Italian surname. Notable people with the surname include:

Davide Malacarne (born 1987), Italian cyclist
Juliana Malacarne (born 1974), American physique competitor
Lucas Malacarne (born 1988), Argentine footballer
Paolo Malacarne (born 1947), Italian sprint canoeist
Simone Malacarne (born 1989), Italian footballer
Marco Malacarne (born 1956), European Commission high-ranking official

See also 
Malacarne (film)

Italian-language surnames